John Hancock (October 24, 1824 – July 19, 1893) was an American judge and politician. As a member of the Texas Legislature he opposed the secession of Texas during the American Civil War. After the war he represented Texas in the United States House of Representatives as a member of the Democratic Party.

Biography

John Hancock was born in Jackson County, Alabama, the seventh of ten children born to John Allen Hancock and Sarah Ryan Hancock.  His older brother George Duncan Hancock was a veteran of Battle of San Jacinto and represented Travis County in the Eleventh Texas Legislature.

Hancock attended the East Tennessee University at Knoxville. He later worked on his father's farm in Alabama before beginning his study of law in Winchester, Tennessee. In 1846 he was admitted to the Alabama bar.  In January 1847 he moved to Austin, Texas where he practiced law. In 1851 he was elected district judge of the Second Judicial District for a term of six years. After four years he resigned to resume his lucrative law practice, as well as to engage in farming.

Civil War

At the outbreak of the Civil War, Hancock strongly believed that Texas should remain part of the Union. In 1860 he was elected to the Texas House of Representatives as a Unionist. After the secession of Texas in March 1861, he refused to take the oath of allegiance to the Confederate States of America and was expelled from the legislature. During the Civil War he practiced law in the state courts but refused to conduct business or recognize the authority in the Confederate courts. He refused to take part in military service during the war, and in 1864 he fled to Mexico to escape conscription for the Confederacy. After the end of the war he returned to Texas and took part in the restoration of order, including serving as a delegate to the state constitutional convention in 1866.

Post war years

In 1870 he was elected to the United States Congress and served from 1871 to 1877. He served again from 1883 to 1885. He supported the Native American policy of Ulysses S. Grant, which called for placing Native Americans on reservations under supervision of the federal government. While in Congress he helped in the passage of acts related to Native American policy. These acts included changing the manner of issuing rations to Native Americans on the reservations, stipulating that they were to be given once a week, as well as prohibiting Native American hunting-parties unless accompanied by United States Army troops. This latter policy ended raids by Native Americans from the reservations. He also helped establish a military telegraph around the Texas frontier.

Death

He died in Austin in 1893 and is buried in Oakwood Cemetery.

Legacy
On the eighth season of Who Do You Think You Are?, actress and comedian Aisha Tyler learned that Congressman John Hancock was her great-great-great-grandfather. Hancock fathered two sons with one of his slaves. The older, surviving son, Hugh Hancock, is through whom Tyler is descended. Hugh Hancock would become a prominent leader of the Austin African-American community. Active in the local Republican Party, Hugh ran a bar called the Black Elephant. Hugh Berry Hancock died in Pocatello, Idaho

References

External links
Entry for John Hancock from the Biographical Encyclopedia of Texas published 1880, hosted by the Portal to Texas History.

1824 births
1893 deaths
Democratic Party members of the Texas House of Representatives
Politicians from Austin, Texas
People of Texas in the American Civil War
Burials at Oakwood Cemetery (Austin, Texas)
People from Jackson County, Alabama
University of Tennessee alumni
Democratic Party members of the United States House of Representatives from Texas
People expelled from United States state legislatures
Southern Unionists in the American Civil War
19th-century American politicians